Djamel Eddine Mesbah (born 9 October 1984) is an Algerian former professional footballer who last played as a left back for Étoile Carouge.

An Algerian international, Mesbah was a member of the Algeria national team at two World Cups, the 2010 FIFA World Cup in South Africa and the 2014 FIFA World Cup in Brazil, as well as 2013 Africa Cup of Nations in South Africa. As of 27 March 2019, he has 35 international caps and 1 goal for the Desert Foxes.

Club career

Early career
Born in Zighoud Youcef, Algeria, Mesbah began his playing career in the junior ranks of French club US Annecy-le-Vieux before being spotted by scouts from Swiss side Servette FC in 2001. He progressed through the ranks at Servette and made his senior debut in the 2003–04 Swiss Super League season, playing in 11 games and scoring 3 goals.

Switzerland
In the summer of 2004, he left the club as it was facing financial difficulties and joined FC Basel. Used mostly as a substitute, he would go on to make just 11 appearances and score 1 goal. In January 2006, he was loaned out to FC Lorient who were playing in Ligue 2 at the time. However, he was injured before he could make his debut and never featured for them.

In the summer of 2006, he signed with FC Aarau, a Swiss club playing in the countries second division. He stayed there for two seasons and was a starter the entire time. He was signed by FC Luzern on 1 July 2008, but made only 6 appearances the whole year, all of which were coming off the substitute bench.

Avellino
On 1 September 2008, he was signed by Avellino, the first Italian club in his career.

Lecce
In July 2009 he was signed by U.S. Lecce. At Lecce he played mostly as a left sided midfielder, but occasionally as a central midfielder or even a left sided wing-back. His ability to play many positions well, attracted the interest of a few Italian clubs.

A.C. Milan

On 18 January 2012, US Lecce announced that Mesbah would be leaving the club to join A.C. Milan. The following day, Milan confirmed the transfer, announcing that Mesbah had signed a four and a half-year contract with the club for an €1.2 million transfer fee

On 26 January 2012, Mesbah made his debut for Milan, starting in the 2011–12 Coppa Italia quarter-final tie against Lazio. Mesbah played the entire match with Milan going on to win 3–1. On 20 March 2012, Mesbah scored his first goal for Milan, in a 2–2 draw with Juventus in the Semi-Finals of the 2011–12 Coppa Italia. His goal tied the game 1–1, but proved ineffective as Milan drew in extra time to exit the cup on aggregate 4–3. He made a total of twelve appearances in all competitions for Milan, including two in the UEFA Champions League, one against Arsenal and the other against Barcelona. The away leg at Arsenal was his first appearance in the competition.

In the 2012–13 season, Mesbah was used even more sparingly, and, due to form and injury, he made just two appearances in the first half of the season. This prompted Milan to sell the player to Parma F.C. in January 2013, in a cashless swap with Cristian Zaccardo.

Parma
Mesbah was again used sparingly at Parma and he made seven appearances until the end of the 12/13 season. The next season Mesbah made just four further appearances and so went out on loan to A.S. Livorno Calcio in January 2014.

Livorno (loan)
At Livorno, Mesbah was a constant starter. He played as their left sided wingback in a 3-5-2 formation but unfortunately was unable to help Livorno in their push to avoid relegation.

Sampdoria
Mesbah signed for U.C. Sampdoria late on 1 September 2014 (swap with Juan Antonio), penning a three-year deal with the Genovese club. It was his fourth different club since January 2012.

Étoile Carouge
Mesbah joined Étoile Carouge FC in January 2019.

International career
In May 2010, Mesbah was called up for the first time to the Algeria national team by Rabah Saâdane for a two-week training camp in Crans-Montana, Switzerland in preparation for the 2010 World Cup. Mesbah made his debut for the team two weeks later, on 28 May 2010, as a starter in a friendly against the Republic of Ireland. He was included in the final 23-man squad for the World Cup.

Career statistics

Club

International

Scores and results list Algeria's goal tally first, score column indicates score after each Mesbah goal.

Honours
Basel
Swiss Super League: 2004–05

References

External links

1984 births
Living people
People from Constantine Province
Algerian footballers
Association football fullbacks
Algeria international footballers
Étoile Carouge FC players
FC Lausanne-Sport players
Servette FC players
FC Basel players
FC Luzern players
FC Aarau players
FC Lorient players
U.S. Avellino 1912 players
U.S. Lecce players
A.C. Milan players
Parma Calcio 1913 players
U.S. Livorno 1915 players
U.C. Sampdoria players
F.C. Crotone players
Swiss Super League players
Swiss Challenge League players
Serie A players
Serie B players
2010 FIFA World Cup players
2013 Africa Cup of Nations players
2014 FIFA World Cup players
2015 Africa Cup of Nations players
2017 Africa Cup of Nations players
Algerian expatriate footballers
Algerian expatriate sportspeople in Switzerland
Expatriate footballers in Switzerland
Expatriate footballers in Italy
Algerian expatriate sportspeople in Italy
21st-century Algerian people